The European qualification for the 2015 FIVB Volleyball Men's U21 World Championship, in Mexico will be played over two rounds.

In the first round of qualification, 21 teams are split into six pools. The pool winners will qualify for the second round and join the champions and the runners-up of the 2014 U20 European Championship already secured in the second round.

First round

Pools
The pools were confirmed by CEV on October 7, 2014.

Pool A
Venue:  Kildeskovshallen, Gentofte, Denmark
All times are Central European Time (UTC+01:00).

|}

|}

Pool B
Venue:  Športna Dvorana Hoče, Spodnje Hoče, Slovenia
All times are Central European Time (UTC+01:00).

|}

|}

Pool C
Venue:  Bluebox Hall, Graz, Austria
All times are Central European Time (UTC+01:00).

|}

|}

Pool D
Venue:  Eurovolley Center, Vilvoorde, Belgium
All times are Central European Time (UTC+01:00).

|}

|}

Pool E
Venue:  Bujtosi Szabadidő Csarnok, Nyíregyháza, Hungary
All times are Central European Time (UTC+01:00).

|}

|}

Pool F
Venue:  Landstede Sportcentrum, Zwolle, Netherlands
All times are Central European Time (UTC+01:00).

|}

|}

Second round

Pool G
Venue:  Energia Hall, Bełchatów, Poland
All times are Central European Summer Time (UTC+02:00).

|}

|}

Pool H
Venue:  Športna Dvorana Nova Gorica, Nova Gorica, Slovenia
All times are Central European Summer Time (UTC+02:00).

|}

|}

References

External links
Official website

FIVB Volleyball Men's U21 World Championship
European Men's U21 qualification World Championship